Mary Freeman (29 March 1924 - 4 March 2018), known professionally by her maiden name of Mary Whitear, was an English marine biologist and lecturer at University College London from 1947 to 1989.

She was known for her attempts to determine the skin colour of extinct animals such as the ichthyosaur and her meticulous drawings of fossils. Her husband was the zoologist Richard Broke Freeman. In retirement she took up the local history of Tavistock, Devon.

References

External links
Mary Whitear's research

1924 births
2018 deaths
People from Teignmouth
Academics of University College London
English marine biologists
Historians of Devon
Women marine biologists
Place of birth missing
Place of death missing